The Daniel Carr House is a historic house on Brier Hill Road in Haverhill, New Hampshire.  Built about 1796, the house is most notable for the high quality folk murals drawn on its walls, most likely by the itinerant artist Rufus Porter between 1825 and 1830.  The house was listed on the National Register of Historic Places in 1992.

Description and history
The house is a connected farmstead, with a -story main house, from which a series of ells extend northward and then east to a barn. The main block is five bays wide, with a center entrance flanked by pilasters and topped by a transom window and corniced entablature. The first ell, also two stories, is probably older. The interior follows a center hall plan, with parlors on either side of the center hall, where a staircase rises to the second floor. The western parlor, as well as both levels of the hall, feature painted and stenciled artwork on their walls, above wooden wainscoting and chair rails. The parlor is painted in multiple colors, with scenes that include the Portland Observatory and a cluster of houses on an island. The panels in the hall and stairwall are monochrome and less elaborate. The border stencilwork in these rooms is a careful reproduction of the original stencilwork, which has deteriorated and is now encapsulated under a layer of skimcoat plaster.

The main block of the house was built c. 1825–30, probably by John Carr, and was attached to an earlier -story structure built by Daniel Carr c. 1796, which was rebuilt in the 1980s.  The murals drawn on its walls are most likely by the itinerant artist Rufus Porter, and were probably drawn between 1825 and 1830, when Porter is known to have been working in this region.  The house underwent a major restoration effort in the 1980s after standing vacant for two decades, and as of 2014 remained in Carr family hands.

See also
National Register of Historic Places listings in Grafton County, New Hampshire

References

Houses on the National Register of Historic Places in New Hampshire
Federal architecture in New Hampshire
Houses completed in 1825
Houses in Grafton County, New Hampshire
National Register of Historic Places in Grafton County, New Hampshire
Haverhill, New Hampshire